Sophie Huet (20 January 1953 – 29 July 2017) was a French journalist. She was a political journalist for Le Figaro, and the first woman to serve as the president of the Association of Parliamentary Journalists.

Early life
Sophie Huet was born on 20 January 1953 in Paris.

Career
Huet began her career as a journalist for L'Aurore in 1976. She covered politics in 1977 and the French Parliament in 1978. She joined Le Figaro in 1980.

Huet served as the president of the Association of Parliamentary Journalists from 2006 to 2017. She was the first woman to serve in this capacity.

Huet was the author of three books, one of which she co-wrote with Philippe Langenieux-Villard. She became an officer of the Legion of Honour in 2010.

Personal life and death
Huet was married twice. She first married François Montrognon de Salvert, followed by Lucien Neuwirth.

Huet died on 29 July 2017.

Works

References

1953 births
2017 deaths
Journalists from Paris
French women journalists
French political journalists
20th-century French journalists
21st-century French journalists
Officiers of the Légion d'honneur
Deaths from cancer in France
20th-century French women writers
21st-century French women writers
Le Figaro people